Keenjhar Lake commonly called Malik Lake is located in Thatta District of Sindh the province of Pakistan. It is the largest fresh water lake in Pakistan and an important source of drinking water for Thatta District and Karachi city. Through the construction of a bund on the eastern side, it is said that the lake was formed by the union of two lakes: Sonehri and Keenjhar.

Keenjhar Lake has been declared a ramsar site and a wildlife sanctuary. It provides a favorable habitat of winter migratory birds like ducks, geese, flamingos, cormorants, waders, herons, egrets, ibises, terns, coots and gulls. It has been observed as a breeding area of the black-crowned night heron, the cotton pygmy goose, purple swamphen, and pheasant-tailed jacana.

Keenjhar Lake is a popular tourist resort. Many people from Karachi, Hyderabad and Thatta visit to enjoy picnics, swimming, fishing, and boating.

The famous folklore of Noori Jam Tamachi who was a fisherwoman, is connected to the lake. There is a shrine in the middle of the lake marking Noori's grave, which is visited devotees.

See also
List of dams and reservoirs in Pakistan
Karachi Bulk Water Supply Project
Indus Basin Project
List of lakes in Pakistan

References

External links
 Kalri Lake Water Sports Project, official site

Ramsar sites in Pakistan
Lakes of Sindh
Marine parks of Pakistan
Thatta District
Protected areas of Sindh
Tourist attractions in Thatta